Nicolas "Nic" Youngblud (born January 16, 1981) is a male water polo player from Canada. He was a member of the Canada men's national water polo team, that claimed the bronze medal at the 2007 Pan American Games in Rio de Janeiro, Brazil.

See also
 Canada men's Olympic water polo team records and statistics
 List of men's Olympic water polo tournament goalkeepers

References
 sports-reference
 Canadian Olympic Committee

External links
 

1981 births
Living people
Canadian male water polo players
Water polo goalkeepers
Olympic water polo players of Canada
Water polo players at the 2008 Summer Olympics
Sportspeople from Burlington, Ontario
University of Calgary alumni
Pan American Games bronze medalists for Canada
Pan American Games medalists in water polo
Water polo players at the 2003 Pan American Games
Water polo players at the 2007 Pan American Games
Medalists at the 2003 Pan American Games
Medalists at the 2007 Pan American Games